Petelin is a Slovene language surname from a nickname meaning "rooster" in Slovene. Notable people with the surname include:
 Boris Petelin (1924), Soviet ice hockey player
 Dmitry Petelin (1983), Russian cosmonaut 
 Jan Petelin (1996), Luxembourgish cyclist

Slovene-language surnames
Surnames from nicknames